Digapahandi is a Vidhan Sabha constituency of Ganjam district, Odisha.

This constituency includes Digapahandi, Digapahandi block and 16 Gram panchayats (Rohigam, Baulajholi, Kukudakhandi, Masiakhali, Jagadalpur, Ankushpur, Dakshinapur, Ballipada, Dengapadar, Bontapalli, Anantayi, Lathi, Mohuda, Kankia, Sahala and Baghalati) of Kukudakhandi block.

Elected Members

Four elections were held between 1957 and 2014.
Elected members from the Digapahandi constituency are:
2014: (134): Surya Narayana Patro (BJD) 
2009: (134): Surya Narayana Patro (BJD)
1961: (15): Raghunath Mahapatra (Indian National Congress)
1957: (12): Anangamanjari Devi (Congress) and Mohana Nayak (Congress)

Election Results

2019

2014
In 2014 election,  Biju Janata Dal candidate Surjya Narayan Patro defeated  Indian National Congress candidate Saka Sujit Kumar by a margin of 45,897 votes.

2009
In 2009 election, Biju Janata Dal candidate Surya Narayana Patro defeated Indian National Congress candidate V. Rabi Narayan Raju by a margin of 32,763 votes.

Notes

References

Assembly constituencies of Odisha
Politics of Ganjam district